The Ohio General Assembly, the legislature of the U.S. state of Ohio, has convened many times since statehood became effective on March 1, 1803.

Legislatures

See also
 List of speakers of the Ohio House of Representatives
 Representative history of the Ohio Senate
 Representative history of the Ohio House of Representatives
 List of governors of Ohio
 History of Ohio

References

External links

 , 1983-2019
 

Legislatures
Legislature